The 2001 Arab Super Cup was an international club competition played by the winners and runners up of the Arab Club Champions Cup and Arab Cup Winners' Cup. It was the eight and last edition and was won by Al Hilal of Saudi Arabia.

Teams

Results and standings

References

External links
Arab Super Cup 2001 - rsssf.com

2001
2000–01 in Saudi Arabian football
2000–01 in Tunisian football
2000–01 in Syrian football